Judge Aldrich may refer to:

Ann Aldrich (1927–2010), judge of the United States District Court for the Northern District of Ohio
Bailey Aldrich (1907–2002), judge of the United States Court of Appeals for the First Circuit
Edgar Aldrich (1848–1921), judge of the United States District Court for the District of New Hampshire
Peleg Emory Aldrich (1813–1895), judge of the Massachusetts Superior Court

See also
Chester Hardy Aldrich (1863–1924), justice of the Nebraska Supreme Court